Meretseger ("She who Loves Silence") was an ancient Egyptian queen consort.

Biography

Meretseger appears in sources of the New Kingdom of Egypt as the wife of Senusret III. According to that she would be the first Egyptian queen consort to bear the title Great Royal Wife, which became the standard title for chief wives of pharaohs. She was also the first queen consort whose name was written in a cartouche. However, as there are no contemporary sources relating to Meretseger, she is most likely a creation of the New Kingdom.

Along with Khenemetneferhedjet II and Neferthenut, she is one of three known wives of Senusret III (a fourth, possible wife is Sithathoriunet). She was depicted on a New Kingdom stele now in the British Museum (EA846) and on an inscription in Semna dating to the reign of Thutmose III.

References

19th-century BC women
Great Royal Wives
People whose existence is disputed
Queens consort of the Twelfth Dynasty of Egypt
Senusret III